The 2012 European Speed Skating Championships was the 37th continental speed skating event for women and the 106th for men, that was held at the City Park Ice Rink in Budapest, Hungary, from 6 to 8 January 2012. The competition was also a qualifying event for the 2012 World Allround Speed Skating Championships as the entry quotas were allocated according to the results of the European Championships.

In the absence of defending champion Ivan Skobrev, who did not participate due to an injury, Dutchman Sven Kramer took the men's European title. This was his fifth victory, having won previously four consecutive European Championships between 2007 and 2010. Kramer also ran track records both in the 1500 meters and 5000 metres event, and his overall score of 156.197 is the best ever result at the City Park Ice Rink as well.

In the women's competition previous year's gold medalist Martina Sáblíková retained her title, achieving her third European success in row and fourth overall. Sáblíková also set a new track record in 3000 metres with a time of 4:16.09.

Further two records were beaten over the weekend, both in 500 metres. On the first day of the championships, Sáblíková's compatriot Karolína Erbanová set a new best time, and a day later Konrad Niedźwiedzki of Poland ran a track record on the shortest distance.

Venue
The competition took place at the City Park Ice Rink, an outdoor artificial skating rink situated in the downtown of Budapest. Prior to the championships, the rink went through a renovation and modernization for a fee of 4.7 billion Hungarian Forint (approximately €16 million), of which 3 billion came from the European Regional Development Fund. As a result, the main building was restored to its 19th-century look, the ice surface was expanded by 15 percent and a  embedded cooling system was laid down as well. The races were held on a standard track of 400 meters with outer curves of 29 meters and inner curves of 25 meters radii. Both racing lanes were 4 meters wide, with an additional inside training track of the similar width.

Participating nations

A provisional list of competitors and staff had to be presented until 19 December 2011, while the final deadline of applications for the European Championships was closed on 3 January 2012. Every European member federation of the International Skating Union (ISU), whose racer met the qualification criteria were eligible to delegate one participant to the event, and, according to the rules of the ISU, the following nations had the right to enter additional competitors in virtue of their results in the previous continental event:

 Women:
4 competitors: Netherlands
3 competitors: Czech Republic, Germany, Norway, Poland, Russia
2 competitors: Austria, Belarus

 Men:
4 competitors: Netherlands, Norway
3 competitors: Poland, Russia
2 competitors: Belarus, Belgium, France, Germany, Italy, Latvia, Sweden

Eventually 54 competitors from 18 nations registered officially for the championships, not including the substitutes, in the following distribution:

 (2)
 (2)
 (3)
 (3)
 (1)
 (1)
 (2)
 (5)
 (1)
 (2)
 (1)
 (8)
 (7)
 (6)
 (1)
 (6)
 (1)
 (2)

Although registered for the event, Kaitlyn McGregor from Switzerland and Joel Eriksson from Sweden did not participate at the European Championships.

Events

Schedule

Women's competition
The women's European Championship were held over three days, with the 500 metres and the 3000 metres event in the first day, followed by the 1500 metres event on the second day. Skaters were awarded points according to their times, and the twelve best placed competitors after the second day were eligible to participate in the 5000 metres closing event on the last day of the championship.

The first fourteen skaters earned a spot for their countries for the 2012 World Allround Championships, which means that the Netherlands got four, Russia, Germany Norway and Poland three and the Czech Republic one place.

The entries for the 2013 European Championships were also determined using the results of the European Championships. Countries with at least three skaters in the first twelve earned four entry positions (Netherlands), countries with at least two skaters in the first sixteen earned three quotas (Czech Republic, Germany, Norway, Poland, Russia), and countries with at least one skater in the first twenty earned two places for the next continental championship (Austria, Belgium). All other European ISU members have the right to delegate one skater, subject to the qualifying time limits are met.

500 metres

3000 metres

1500 metres

5000 metres

Points evolution and overall result

Men's competition
The men's event took place on Saturday and Sunday, with the 500 metres and the 5000 metres race at the first day and the 1500 and 10,000 meters final race in the second day. After the first day, the best 24 out of the 29 skaters got the change to participate in the 5000 meters event, while the best 12 competitors after three events took part in the 10,000 meters race.

According to the ISU rules, the fourteen best placed skaters won for their country an entry spots for the 2012 Allround World Championships. Based on the final result, the Netherlands earned four places for the World event, Norway and Poland got two, and Belgium, France, Germany, Latvia and Russia got one each.

The places for the 2013 Allround European Championships were also distributed using the classification of the European Championships. Countries with at least three skaters in the first twelve earned four spots (Netherlands), countries with at least two skaters in the first sixteen earned three (Norway and Poland), and countries with at least one skater in the first twenty earned two starting places (Austria, Belgium, France, Germany, Italy, Latvia, Russia). All other European ISU members have got one spot, subject to the time limits set are met.

500 metres

5000 metres

1500 metres

10000 metres

Points evolution and overall result

See also
 2012 World Allround Speed Skating Championships

References

External links

European Championships
European Speed Skating Championships
European, 2012
International sports competitions in Budapest
2012 in Hungarian sport